The Front for the Liberation of Lebanon from Foreigners (FLLF), or  (FLLE) in French, was a formerly obscure underground militant organization that surfaced in Lebanon at the early 1980s.

According to Ronen Bergman, the front was a "terrorist organization that Israel ran in Lebanon in the years 1980-83" which was set up on the orders of Israel Defense Forces Chief of Staff Rafael Eitan, who instructed Israeli General Avigdor Ben-Gal, together with Meir Dagan, to create and oversee the group in the wake of the 1979 Nahariya attack.

Activities 1979–1983 
Coinciding with an Israeli aerial bombing campaign of PLO centers in Lebanon, the group made its début in July 1981 with a series of car bombings that reached a peak later in September as they unleash a spate of attacks that created havoc in the Muslim quarters of Sidon, Tripoli, Chekka and West Beirut until February 1982. In the latter case, the car bombs were combined with a powerful command-detonated explosive device planted at a packed cinema which it took responsibility on 1 October 1981 with a phone call to the French newspaper, L'Orient-Le Jour.

 (1) The 17 September 1981 Sidon 1981 attack, at around 9 a.m., employed a booby-trapped car packed with 300 kilograms of TNT positioned outside the Joint Forces operational headquarters in that city. The car exploded 15 minutes before a scheduled meeting of Palestinian and Lebanese militants, killing 21-23 people mostly civilians and wounding 96. Four of those killed were militants.
 (2) 17 September 1981 18 September a bomb outside a cement factory in Chekka in the north, frequented by people with pro-Palestinian and pro-Syrian views. Estimates of those killed run from 4 to 10. 8 were reported wounded.
 (3)  A car bomb in Beirut's southern low-income suburb of Hayy al-Salloum, populated by many Shiite refugees from the south, left 3 dead and 3-4 wounded; The Lebanese police suggested that bomb may have exploded before the car reached its real target.

The sixth incident took place at 9:55 am the following day, 2 October, when a Peugeot car packed with over 100 pounds of explosives was detonated outside the Palestine Liberation Organization (PLO) offices in the Fakhani neighbourhood in West Beirut, where Abu Jihad worked. At least 50 people were reportedly killed and more than 250 wounded. Other attacks undertaken that same month targeted Syrian troops of the Arab Deterrent Force.

FLLF operations came to a sudden halt just prior to the June 1982 Israeli invasion of Lebanon, only to be resumed the following year with four huge car bomb attacks: the first one on 28 January 1983 struck a PLO headquarters at Chtaura in the Syrian-controlled Beqaa Valley, killing 40.

On 6 February, shortly before 2 pm., a car bomb exploded and devastated the Palestine Research Center offices in West Beirut, leaving 18-20 people dead and at least 115 wounded. Among the victims was the wife of Sabri Jiryis. A third bombing occurred on Syrian-controlled Baalbek on 7 August 1983, which killed about 30 people and injured nearly 40, followed by another on 5 December 1983 at the Chyah quarter of the Southern suburbs of Beirut that claimed the lives of 12 people and maimed over 80.
The group ceased its actions shortly afterwards, though some observers believe that they remained active as late as mid-1984.

Attempted Assassination of the US Ambassador
Henry Kissinger had Gerard Ford authorize contacts with the PLO to secure the safety of the US Embassy and American citizens in Lebanon, a role the PLO subsequently agreed to take on. Coordination between US intelligence and the PLO became extensive in the following years during ambassadorship of Richard Parker. This arrangement violated the terms of an earlier 1975 Memorandum of Agreement with Israel, yet continued when John Gunther Dean took over from Parker in 1978, and covered an even wider spectrum of regional issues.  When Israel discovered the cooperation, Mossad argued that it was necessary to "cut the channel" between the US and the PLO. To that end, it first dispatched a team of agents to assassinate the PLO figure, Abu Hassan Salameh, who acted as the key intelligence intermediary for these exchanges with the US.

On 27 August 1980, an attempt was made on the lives of the US Ambassador to Lebanon, Dean and his family. Dean, of Ashkenazi descent, had been authorized to deal with the PLO when American Security Interests were involved, something which disturbed Israel. At Dean's request – he had sought counsel from Walid Khalidi – Arafat and Abu Walid chief commander of the PLO forces in Lebanon, had intervened by traveling to Tehran in November 1979, to secure the release of 13 Americans taken hostage in Iran in 1979. The PLO's decisive role was never publicly acknowledged by the US administration.   Dean was known to send cables regularly to Israel and the State Department protesting IAF violations of Lebanese airspace. He had, in the face of Israeli objections, seconded the Lebanese government's movement of two of its battalions to Southern Lebanon, in order to assert Lebanese sovereignty. Dean later provided a detailed eyewitness account of the episode and its aftermath to both the Jimmy Carter Library and Museum and the ADST Foreign Affairs Oral History Project.

Dean always informed all parties, including the Israelis, of his movements. According to his reconstruction of events, the motorcade taking Dean and his family from his hilltrop retreat in Yarze back to Beirut around 7 pm on the 27 August was ambushed and struck with a fusillade of 21 shots, while Dean's limousine was also hit by two light anti-tank grenades. The first car in which his daughter and son-in-law were seated was completely destroyed, but not before they managed to run and leap into the third security car. Under return fire, the assassins abandoned their weapons and fled. The Lebanese chief of intelligence, Johnny Abdo conducted a thorough investigation of the arms left behind, ascertaining their markings and numbers. After communicating the data to Washington, and waiting 3 weeks, he was informed of the date of purchase, the buyer's name, and when the cargo was shipped to Israel in 1974. The FLLF later claimed responsibility for this attempted assassination. Dean thought that there was no doubt Israel lay behind the attempt on his life. Israel's role in creating the FLLP and furnishing it with arms and explosives was later acknowledged by Israeli intelligence officials. On being informed of the results of the investigation, the then U.S. Ambassador to Israel, Samuel W. Lewis raised the matter with the Israeli government.

Some sources state that the accusation in Dean's eyewitness account is unproven to this day, or that the very notion that Israelis would target an American Ambassador is "unconceivable". Dean recalled the incident as "one of the more unsavory episodes in our Middle Eastern history."

List of incidents, claimed or attributed
According to Lee O'Brien writing for Merip the pattern of these "internal"  car bombings overlapped with specific areas targeted later by Israel in its invasion.

Disclosure of Israel's role by Ronen Bergman 
The PLO Chairman Yasser Arafat suspected the that the Israeli intelligence services was orchestrating the bombings claimed by the FLLF during the fall of 1981. The fact that Israel was behind the formation of the FLLF emerged in the early 1980s when an officer who had served with one of its coordinators, Meir Dagan, was shocked by the operations undertaken by the group and made an anonymous complaint. After rumour of his views reached the press, – though publication was forbidden by the military censor – Menachem Begin ordered an investigation. An undisclosed officer chosen by Yehoshua Sagi determined that the gravamen of the complaint – that Eitan together with the head of Israel's northern command, Ben-Gal, Shlomo Ilya, an intelligence officer, and Dagan had deceived the government by hiding Israel's role in FLLF operations – was true.

The FLLF was set up in 1979 in the wake of the massacre of an Israeli family at Nahariya by militants belonging to the Palestine Liberation Front (PLF). To that end, Maronite Christian, Shiite and Druze operatives were recruited in 1979. The operations which it carried out against the Palestinian Liberation Organization in Lebanon were coordinated by Meir Dagan, reportedly without informing the IDF, the Israeli Defense Ministry, the Israeli government and its various defense agencies. David Agmon, at the time head of Israel's northern command, was one of the few people who were briefed on its operations. The aim of the series of operations was to:
cause chaos among the Palestinians and Syrians in Lebanon, without leaving an Israeli fingerprint, to give them the feeling that they were constantly under attack and to instill them with a sense of insecurity.

Dagan had a reputation for ruthlessness, with rumours circulating he had engaged in operations involving techniques like car bombings and poisoning. Two journalists from Yediot Ahronot investigated a story purporting that he ran a secret unit in Lebanon whose mission was to instigate terrorist events that would justify an incursion. The military censor suppressed publication of the article and, in 2012, Dagan denied the "thrust of the story". However, some years later, Avigdor Ben-Gal supplied details on the operation to Ronen Bergman, an Israeli investigative journalist and authority on Israeli military intelligence, in which Dagan was mentioned as a key operative. According to Bergman, both Dagan and Ben-Gal later disclaimed any intention of hitting civilian targets.

Bergman also argued that the explosives used in operations were drawn from material conserved by an IDF bomb disposal unit from the spoils of war with the enemy – rockets, grenades and mines – in order to minimize the chance of their being traced back to Israel if they were discovered. The explosives were then hidden in oil cans and tins for preserves built at a metal shop in Ben-Gal's former kibbutz, Mahanayim. There, the drums were carried over the border into Lebanon by couriers, or, if the consignments were too large, on motorcycles, bicycles, or donkeys.

See also 
 Guardians of the Cedars
 Israel and state-sponsored terrorism
 Lebanese Civil War
 Lebanese Forces (Militia)
 Lebanese Liberation Front
 Liberation Battalion
 List of weapons of the Lebanese Civil War
 Sons of the South
 Popular Revolutionary Resistance Organization
 Rise and Kill First

Notes

Citations

Sources

Further reading

External links
 FLLF profile on START Terrorist database. 
 List of incidents involving the FLLF on the Global Terrorism Database (GTD).
 RAND database, search for "Front for the Liberation of Lebanon from Foreigner" gives 11 attacks
 FLLF, Israel's Little secret, database over attacks

Factions in the Lebanese Civil War
False flag operations
Israeli–Lebanese conflict
State-sponsored terrorism